Vennamo is a Finnish surname. Notable people with the surname include:

Pekka Vennamo (born 1944), Finnish politician
Veikko Vennamo (1913–1997), Finnish politician

Finnish-language surnames
Surnames of Finnish origin